Carolyn Dennis (born April 12, 1954), sometimes known professionally as Carol Dennis or Carol Dennis-Dylan, is an American singer and actress best known for her work with and marriage to Bob Dylan.

Career
Dennis has also sung back-up for Wonderlove, Minnie Riperton, Táta Vega, The Carpenters, Kenny Loggins, Bruce Springsteen, and Michael Jackson's HIStory: Past, Present and Future, Book I. In 1982, Dennis performed the role of Poppea in a modern adaptation of Monteverdi's L'Incoronazione di Poppea (The Coronation of Poppea) at Xenon Discothèque in New York City. She was the singing voice for the 1991 made-for-television movie The Josephine Baker Story starring Lynn Whitfield as Josephine Baker. Dennis was also part of the performance group The Young Americans.

On Broadway, she was a member of the original cast of such notable musicals as Big River (1985) and The Color Purple (2005).

Personal life
Dennis and Dylan have a child, Desiree Gabrielle Dennis-Dylan, born on January 31, 1986. They married in June 1986; Dennis was Dylan's second wife. The couple divorced in October 1992. 

Their marriage and parenthood was completely unknown to both Dylan's fans and the media until the 2001 publication of Down the Highway: The Life of Bob Dylan by Howard Sounes.

See also
Slow Train Coming
Saved
Empire Burlesque

References

External links 
 

1954 births
American women singers
Living people
Bob Dylan
The Young Americans members